Ekberg  is a Swedish surname. Notable people with the surname include:

Anita Ekberg, Swedish model and actress 
Oskar Ekberg (born 1977), Swedish pianist 
Ragnar Ekberg, (1886–1966), Swedish track and field athlete
Stefan Ekberg, Swedish motorcycle speedway rider 
Sten Ekberg, Swedish track and field athlete
Ulf Ekberg, Swedish singer, songwriter and producer

Swedish-language surnames